Christmas Party or Xmas Party may refer to:

 A party, held to celebrate Christmas

Christmas Party

Music
 Christmas Party (The Monkees album) or the title track, 2018
 Christmas Party (RuPaul album) or the title song, 2018
 Christmas Party (She & Him album), 2016
 Christmas Party, an album by the Kelly Family, 2022
 "Christmas Party", a song by Eraserheads from Fruitcake, 1996
 "Christmas Party", a song by Megan Trainor from A Very Trainor Christmas, 2020

Literature
 The Christmas Party (play), a 1724 play by Ludvig Holberg
 "Christmas Party" (short story), a 1957 Nero Wolfe novella by Rex Stout

Television
 "Christmas Party" (Nero Wolfe episode), a 2001 adaptation of the novella
 "Christmas Party" (The Office), a 2005 episode of the U.S. series
 The Christmas Party, a 1997–2003 Cartoon Network programming block

Xmas Party
 "Xmas Party", a 2008 episode of The Inbetweeners
 Xmas Party Album, a 2014 album by the Vengaboys